Belmond Grand Hotel Timeo is a hotel located at the centre of Taormina in Sicily, adjacent to the Greek Theatre.

Chronology

References

Further reading
Orient Express – A personal Journey by James Sherwood

External links 
Official website
Belmond.com

Belmond hotels